Andrey Viktorovich Tikhonov  (Russian: Андрей Викторович Тихонов; born 11 December 1966) is a Russian (formerly Soviet) long-distance runner. He competed in the men's 5000 metres at the 1992 Summer Olympics, representing the Unified Team.

References

1966 births
Living people
Sportspeople from Kemerovo
Soviet male long-distance runners
Olympic athletes of the Unified Team
Athletes (track and field) at the 1992 Summer Olympics
World Athletics Championships athletes for Russia
Russian Athletics Championships winners
CIS Athletics Championships winners